Jaunpiebalga is a village in Jaunpiebalga Parish, Cēsis Municipality  in the Vidzeme region of Latvia. Jaunpiebalga had 880 residents as of 2021.

References

Towns and villages in Latvia
Kreis Wenden
Cēsis Municipality
Vidzeme